Basswood Grove is an unincorporated community in Denmark Township, Washington County, Minnesota, United States.  The community is located along Washington County Road 21 (St. Croix Trail South) near 80th Street South and 87th Street South.

Nearby places include Cottage Grove, Afton, and Hastings.

References

Unincorporated communities in Minnesota
Unincorporated communities in Washington County, Minnesota